Mohammed bin Ibrahim Al Mutawa (born September 1947) is a Bahraini politician, who served at different cabinet posts.

Early life and education
Mutawa was born in September 1947. He received degrees in philosophy, psychology, and social sciences from the University of Alexandria.

Career
In 1972, Mutawa started his career as the head of youth activities at the then-labor and social affairs ministry. In 1974, he began to serve at the prime minister's office. In 1977, he was appointed executive director of the office and in office until 1993. He served as the minister of cabinet affairs from 1993 to 2005. From 26 June 1995 to 2001, he served as the minister of information. In 2001, he was appointed minister of the premier's affairs. From 2002 to 2006, he served as the minister of the cabinet affairs.

Mutawa was appointed cultural affairs advisor to prime minister in 2005. In 2009, he was nominated by Bahrain for the post of the general secretary of the Gulf Cooperation Council while serving as cultural affairs advisor. However, his nomination was not endorsed by Qatar. As a result of Qatar's objection over his nomination, Abdullatif bin Rashid Al Zayani was nominated by Bahrain for the post.

Mutawa has been serving as state minister for follow-up since 2010.

References

1947 births
Alexandria University alumni
Government ministers of Bahrain
Living people